Choeromorpha callizona is a species of beetle in the family Cerambycidae. It was described by White in 1856. It is known from Borneo and Malaysia.

References

Choeromorpha
Beetles described in 1856